Cedar Island is an island in Moser Bay in Alaska and is the nearest island to the town of Loring, approximately  NNW of Prince Rupert, British Columbia.

Cedar Island is located at  (55.58333, -131.6775).

Transportation
All transportation to and from the island is by boat.

External links

Islands of the Alexander Archipelago
Islands of Ketchikan Gateway Borough, Alaska
Islands of Alaska